Dhaka-6 is a constituency represented in the Jatiya Sangsad (National Parliament) of Bangladesh since 2014 by Kazi Firoz Rashid of the Jatiya Party (Ershad).

Boundaries 
The constituency encompasses Dhaka South City Corporation wards 34 and 37 through 46.

History 
The constituency was created for the first general elections in newly independent Bangladesh, held in 1973.

Ahead of the 2008 general election, the Election Commission redrew constituency boundaries to reflect population changes revealed by the 2001 Bangladesh census. The 2008 redistricting added 7 new seats to the Dhaka metropolitan area, increasing the number of constituencies in the capital from 8 to 15, and reducing the extent of the constituency.

The seat became vacant upon the death of the sitting MP Mizanur Rahman Khan Dipu on 21 December 2013. It was filled in the 2014 general election two weeks later.

In the 2018 general election, the constituency was one of six chosen by lottery to use electronic voting machines.

Members of Parliament

Elections

Elections in the 2010s

Elections in the 2000s

Elections in the 1990s

Elections in the 1970s

References

External links
 

Parliamentary constituencies in Bangladesh
Dhaka District